Iran participated in the 2014 Asian Beach Games in Phuket, Thailand from 14 November to 23 November 2014.

Competitors

Medal summary

Medal table

Medalists

Results by event

Aquatics

Beach water polo

Men

Beach athletics

Men

Beach kabaddi

Men

Beach kurash

Men

Beach sambo

Men

Mixed

Beach sepak takraw

Men

Beach soccer

Men

Beach volleyball

Men

Beach wrestling

Men

Bodybuilding

Men

Extreme sports

Aggressive inline
Open

Skateboarding
Open

Footvolley

Men

Ju-jitsu

Men's ne-waza

Muaythai

Men

Sport climbing

Men

Squash

Men

Triathlon

Duathlon

Men

Triathlon

Men

References

External links 
 Official website

Nations at the 2014 Asian Beach Games
2014
Asian Beach Games